2019 Vuelta a Andalucía was the 65th edition of the Vuelta a Andalucía road cycling race. It was held from 20 to 24 February 2019 as a 2.HC event on the 2019 UCI Europe Tour.

Teams
Nineteen teams started the race. Each team had a maximum of seven riders:

Route

Stages

Stage 1

Stage 2

Stage 3

Stage 4

Stage 5

Classifications

References

External links
 

2019 UCI Europe Tour
2019 in Spanish road cycling
2019
Vuelta a Andalucía